The 2013 Kurume Best Amenity Cup was a professional tennis tournament played on outdoor grass courts. It was the ninth edition of the tournament which was part of the 2013 ITF Women's Circuit, offering a total of $50,000 in prize money. It took place in Kurume, Japan, on 13–19 May 2013.

WTA entrants

Seeds 

 1 Rankings as of 6 May 2013

Other entrants 
The following players received wildcards into the singles main draw:
  Miyu Kato
  Yumi Miyazaki
  Yumi Nakano
  Akiko Yonemura

The following players received entry from the qualifying draw:
  Yuka Higuchi
  Kanae Hisami
  Miki Miyamura
  Yuuki Tanaka

Champions

Singles 

  Ons Jabeur def.  An-Sophie Mestach 6–0, 6–2

Doubles 

  Kanae Hisami /  Mari Tanaka def.  Rika Fujiwara /  Akiko Omae 6–4, 7–6(7–2)

External links 
 2013 Kurume Best Amenity Cup at ITFtennis.com
  

Kurume Best Amenity Cup
Kurume Best Amenity Cup
2013 in Japanese tennis